The ambassador of the United States to the Holy See is the official representative of the United States of America to the Holy See, the leadership of the Catholic Church. The official representation began with the formal opening of diplomatic relations with the Holy See by President Ronald Reagan and Pope John Paul II in 1984.

Before the establishment of formal diplomatic relations, President Franklin D. Roosevelt's Postmaster General James Farley was the first high-ranking government official to normalize relations with the Holy See in 1933. In addition, Myron Taylor would serve during World War II as an emissary for President Franklin D. Roosevelt. In 1951, President Harry S. Truman's pick of World War II hero Mark W. Clark was defeated.

Between 1951 and 1968, the United States had no official representative accredited to the Holy See. President Richard Nixon changed this when he appointed Henry Cabot Lodge, Jr. as his personal representative. President Jimmy Carter followed with the appointment of former New York City mayor Robert F. Wagner, Jr. Every ambassador to date has been a member of the Roman Catholic Church. The current ambassador is Joe Donnelly, who presented his credentials to Pope Francis on April 11, 2022.

History before formal diplomatic relations established

The United States had diplomatic relations with the Papal States from 1797 to 1867. The Papal States ceased to exist in 1870, when its last territory (the city of Rome) was lost to the Kingdom of Italy. After that, the international status of the Papacy was controversial until 1929, when the Italian government agreed to the establishment of Vatican City as a sovereign city-state.

The United States was slow to establish full diplomatic relations with the re-established Holy See, partly due to the prevalence of anti-Catholicism in the United States.  President Franklin D. Roosevelt's Postmaster General James Farley was the first high-ranking government official to normalize relations with the Holy See in 1933 when the Postmaster General set sail for Europe, along with Soviet Commissar of Foreign Affairs Maxim Litvinoff on the Italian Liner SS Conte di Savoia. In Italy Farley had an audience with Pope Pius XI, and dinner with Cardinal Pacelli, who was to accede to the papacy in 1939. Myron Charles Taylor, an industrialist, philanthropist and diplomat (starting with World War II), served from December 1939 until 1950 as an emissary to Pope Pius XII for Presidents Franklin D. Roosevelt and Harry S. Truman.

On October 20, 1951, Truman nominated Mark W. Clark, a U.S. Army general and World War II hero, to be emissary to the Holy See. Clark later withdrew his nomination on January 13, 1952, following protests from U.S. Senator Tom Connally from Texas and Protestant groups.

Between 1951 and 1968, the United States had no official representative accredited to the Holy See.

In 1969, President Richard Nixon changed this when he appointed—as his personal representative—Henry Cabot Lodge, Jr., a former U.S. Senator from Massachusetts, Nixon's 1960 Republican vice presidential running mate and a former U.S. ambassador (to the United Nations, South Vietnam, and West Germany).

In 1978, President Jimmy Carter followed with the appointment of Robert F. Wagner, Jr., a former mayor of New York City and U.S. Ambassador to Spain.

List of ambassadors
The following is a list of U.S. ambassadors to the Holy See:

Vacancy controversies
In 2009, the post of ambassador remained vacant for several months because of tensions between the Vatican and the Obama Administration over the issues of abortion and same-sex marriage. Three candidates were mentioned, including Caroline Kennedy and Douglas Kmiec.

From November 2012 through mid-2013, the seat was also vacant, after Miguel H. Díaz left the office to teach at the University of Dayton. President Barack Obama nominated Ken Hackett, a longtime president of Catholic Relief Services, for the position in June 2013. Ken Hackett was confirmed by the U.S. Senate as U.S. Ambassador to the Holy See on August 1, 2013.

See also
Apostolic Nunciature to the United States
Embassy of the United States to the Holy See
Holy See–United States relations

Notes

References

External links
 United States Department of State: Chiefs of Mission for the Holy See
 United States Department of State: Holy See
 United States Embassy in Vatican City
United States Department of State: Background notes on the Holy See

Holy See
 
United States